Colin Charles James (born 25 November 1944) is a New Zealand political journalist and commentator. He is a life member of the Parliament of New Zealand's press gallery and has a focus on party and election politics.

James wrote a weekly column in the Otago Daily Times, a monthly column in Management Magazine and previously wrote a weekly column in The New Zealand Herald.  He was formerly editor of the National Business Review and has also written for the Far Eastern Economic Review.

He is the New Zealand correspondent of Oxford Analytica and has written a number of books and presented numerous papers at conferences both in New Zealand and overseas, including through his role with the Institute for Governance and Policy Studies at the University of Victoria. He sometimes speaks on television and radio.

He is an associate (and was previously managing director) of The Hugo Group, a forecasting panel with a membership of around 90 medium to large-sized organisations. The Hugo Group also works with organisations to help them understand their strategic environment.

James believes that as a political commentator he should not vote and has not done so since 1975, and his political views are not publicly known.

Bibliography
Building the Constitution (2000 – editor)
The Quiet Revolution published by Allen & Unwin New Zealand Limited in association with Port Nicholson Press, Wellington (1986).
New Territory (1992)
Covering Elections – A Guide for Journalists

References

External links
 Official web site

1944 births
Living people
New Zealand journalists
People educated at Taieri College